is a selection of songs and nursery rhymes widely beloved in Japan, sponsored by the Agency for Cultural Affairs and the Parents-Teachers Association of Japan. A poll was held in 2006 choosing the songs from a list of 895. The results were announced in 2007. Although it is called a compilation of 100 songs, the list actually includes 101 songs.

The idea for the compilation came from famed psychologist and agency chief Hayao Kawai, with an aim to prevent juvenile delinquency and to combat the "weakening" of Japan's shared cultural heritage. The agency released a CD and a songbook with printed melodies for all 101 songs to be used in public schools. The Asahi Shimbun used this list to compile a list of 15 most endangered children's songs.

The composer and lyricist for several songs published by the Japanese Ministry of Education in the early 1900s are unknown.

The songs are numbered by the Japanese syllabary in gojūon ordering.

References

External links
 Agency for Cultural Affairs. "親子で歌いつごう 日本の歌百選". Retrieved 2 July 2008.

Lists of musical works
Japanese music-related lists
Japanese songs